Halbert Wilson Brooks (December 9, 1885 – March 17, 1963) was a member of the Wisconsin State Assembly.

Biography
Brooks was born on December 9, 1885 in Green Lake, Wisconsin. He attended Ripon College, where he later became the track coach. He married Irene Gilkey (1887–1968) in 1908. From 1925 to 1926, he was Sheriff of Green Lake County, Wisconsin. He died at a retirement home in Markesan, Wisconsin in 1963.

Political career
Brooks was a member of the Assembly twice. First, from 1945 to 1946 and second, from 1949 to 1952. Additionally, he was President and Treasurer of Green Lake and a member of the Green Lake County Board. He was a Republican.

References

External links

People from Green Lake, Wisconsin
County supervisors in Wisconsin
Republican Party members of the Wisconsin State Assembly
Wisconsin sheriffs
College track and field coaches in the United States
Ripon College (Wisconsin) alumni
1885 births
1963 deaths
20th-century American politicians